Warraber Island Airport  is an airport in Sue Islet, Queensland, Australia. It was named Nelson Airport and officially opened on 26 November 1977.

Airlines and destinations

See also
List of airports in Queensland

References

Airports in Queensland
Airports established in 1977
Torres Strait Islands communities